"Cold World" is a song recorded by Steve "Silk" Hurley along with Jamie Principle.

The single was released as the second single from the Hurley's compilation Work It Out on Atlantic Records in 1989, and it charted at number twenty-two on the U.S. Billboard Hot Dance Music/Club Play chart.

Credits and personnel
Steve Hurley - producer, mix
Jamie Principle - writer, featuring vocal, producer, engineer
Frank Rodrigo - executive producer, engineer
Larry Sturm - engineer

Official versions
"Cold World (LP Version)" - 5:30
"Cold World (Extended Mix)" - 5:56
"Cold World (Funky Acid Mix)" - 4:50
"Cold World (Radio Edit)" - 4:33
"Cold World (Funky Radio Edit)" - 4:30
"Cold World (Funky Cold Mix) - 5:54
"Cold World (Mommy Can You Hear Me Mix) - 6:35
"Cold World (Children's Mix) - 4:44

Charts and sales

Peak positions

See also
List of artists who reached number one on the US Dance chart

References

External links
 [ Steve "Silk" Hurley] on AllMusic
 [ Jamie Principle] on AllMusic

1989 songs
1989 singles
Steve "Silk" Hurley songs
Songs written by Jamie Principle
Atlantic Records singles